McBurney may refer to:

McBurney (surname)
McBurney's point, medical sign
McBurney School, defunct high school in New York City